Bam is an impact crater located on the lava plains of Hesperia Planum
(Mare Tyrrhenum quadrangle) on Mars at 25.79 ° S and 115.67° E, approximately 6.8 kilometers in diameter. It was named after a city in the Kerman province of Iran, having had its name approved in April 2017.
 
Bam is considered to be one of the best well-preserved examples of impact craters on Mars, considering the overall crater morphology, thermophysical signatures, and the relatively young age of its target material.

References 

Impact craters on Mars
Mare Tyrrhenum quadrangle